Baltasar Simón Tito Saldoni i Remendo (Barcelona, 4 January 1807 - Madrid, 3 December 1889) was a Spanish composer and musicologist. He was a pupil of Francesc Queralt.

References

19th-century composers
1807 births
1889 deaths
19th-century musicologists
Spanish composers
Spanish male composers
Spanish musicologists
19th-century Spanish musicians
19th-century Spanish male musicians
Musicians from Barcelona